The 1987 Ice Hockey World Championships was the 52nd such event hosted by the International Ice Hockey Federation. It was also the 63rd European Championships. Teams representing 28 countries participated in four levels of competition.

In the Division A Championship held 17 April to 3 May in Vienna, Austria, each team played each other once in the preliminary round. The four best placed teams then played each other once in a championship round and, unlike the relegation round, the first round of results were not counted. Sweden won the gold medal for the fourth time and the Soviet Union won their 25th European title. In the European Championships, only the games of the first round between European teams counted. Switzerland was demoted to Division B.

Sweden's victory was a controversial one.  The Germans had beaten both Canada and Finland when it was revealed that forward Miroslav Sikora had played for the Polish junior team in 1977.  He was suspended and the IIHF stripped West Germany of their two wins.  The Germans took the matter to court, stating that they had been granted permission.  Though Sikora remained suspended, the IIHF reinstated the two victories. If the courts had not intervened, Finland would have replaced Sweden in the medal round. Additionally, the Swedes earned the Gold over the Soviets by goal differential when the Soviets had gone undefeated and the Swedes had lost three preliminary round games.  This led to further discussion of a change of format.  The IIHF's account of the finale states that, "Sweden won thanks to an inflated score against Canada," however Sweden only needed to win by two (the same margin that the Czechoslovaks beat Canada by) for the Gold.  In reality the Soviets had to come from behind to capture Silver and deprive the Czechoslovaks of the Gold, and the Swedes winning by more than two ensured that the Czechoslovaks could not play to a tie and capture Gold.

Promotion and relegation was effective for 1989 as the IIHF did not run a championship in Olympic years at this time.  Nations that did not participate in the Calgary Olympics were invited to compete in the final Thayer Tutt Trophy.

World Championship Group A (Austria)

First round

Final Round

Consolation round 

Switzerland was relegated to Group B.

World Championship Group B (Italy) 
Played in Canazei 26 March to 5 April.  The top three teams earned Olympic berths, and the fourth place team played off against the Group C winner to join them.

Poland was promoted to Group A, and both the Netherlands and China were relegated to Group C.

World Championship Group C (Denmark) 
Played in Copenhagen, Herlev and Hørsholm 20–29 March. In addition to being promoted, the winner played off against the fourth placed Group B team for the final Olympic berth.

Both Japan and Denmark were promoted to Group B.  On the final day, if either Romania or Yugoslavia had won, they would have been promoted, but they tied each other.  Belgium was relegated to Group D, and later Romania chose to compete in Group D as well, for financial reasons.

World Championship Group D (Australia) 
Played in Perth, Western Australia 13–20 March.  Chinese Taipei also played four games as exhibition contests.  They lost 31–3 to Australia, 24–0 to South Korea, 12–1 to New Zealand, and tied Hong Kong 2–2.

Australia was promoted to Group C. Later, when Romania declined to travel to Australia for the 1989 World Ice Hockey Championships Group C for financial reasons, South Korea was promoted to take their place.

Ranking and statistics

Tournament Awards
Best players selected by the directorate:
Best Goaltender:       Dominik Hašek
Best Defenceman:       Craig Hartsburg
Best Forward:          Vladimir Krutov
Media All-Star Team:
Goaltender:  Dominik Hašek
Defence:  Udo Kiessling,  Viacheslav Fetisov
Forwards:  Vladimir Krutov,  Sergei Makarov,  Gerd Truntschka

Final standings
The final standings of the tournament according to IIHF:

European championships final standings
The final standings of the European championships according to IIHF:

Scoring leaders
List shows the top skaters sorted by points, then goals.
Source:

Leading goaltenders
Only the top five goaltenders, based on save percentage, who have played 50% of their team's minutes are included in this list.
Source:

Citations

References 

Detailed account of Championship "Story #44" of IIHF top 100 stories in history.
Complete results

1987
World Championships
I
1987
April 1987 sports events in Europe
May 1987 sports events in Europe
Sports competitions in Vienna
1980s in Vienna
International ice hockey competitions hosted by Italy
March 1987 sports events in Europe
International ice hockey competitions hosted by Denmark
Herlev Municipality
Hørsholm Municipality
1980s in Copenhagen
International sports competitions in Copenhagen
1986–87 in Italian ice hockey
1986–87 in Danish ice hockey
International ice hockey competitions hosted by Australia
Sport in Perth, Western Australia
1980s in Perth, Western Australia
1987 in Australian ice hockey